This is an episode list of the British drama series Our Friends in the North. Dates shown are original airdates on BBC Two.

Lists of British drama television series episodes